DISIP (General Sectoral Directorate of Intelligence and Prevention Services) was an intelligence and counter-intelligence agency inside and outside of Venezuela between 1969 and 2009 when SEBIN was created by former President Hugo Chavez. DISIP was established in March 1969 by then-president Rafael Caldera, replacing the Directorate General of Police (DIGEPOL).

History

Origin
With the overthrow of dictator Marcos Pérez Jiménez in January 1958, Venezuela was plunged into an acute institutional crisis in the police and security area, following the dismantling of the National Security, also called "political police"; the absence of a similar, moderately effective organization gives rise to impromptu Technical Services Criminology, an organization in the popular police jargon was known as Criminology, was a time of much confusion as it was beginning to take shape guerrilla activity and for that reason the political activism of opposition was severely punished.

On April 29, 1959, according to Executive Order No. 51, taking into account the need to define the roles and responsibilities of the various police forces, the general direction of police "DIGEPOL", DISIP's predecessor organization, which creates would have the task "to exercise and coordinate the entire national territory policing aimed at the preservation of order and public tranquility", according to its powers under the Ministry of Interior, in Article No. 18 of the Constitution of Ministries, without prejudice to the legal powers of the Judicial Technical Police and state police. With this decision, the powers of the criminal police, faculty and power of intelligence and state security were separated.

1960s

Creation of DISIP
When Rafael Caldera assumed his first presidency in the Venezuela, he ordered the dissolution of the DIGEPOL and signed Decree No. 15, dated March 19, 1969 giving birth to the "Directorate of Intelligence and Prevention "whose initials are DISIP. Its objective was to demonstrate the initial combat subversion and drug trafficking. Its first commanders took the initiative to establish appropriate training courses and their members, mostly from former members of DIGEPOL.

Political influence
The story of the early years of the DISIP parallels the political group "Bandera Roja", whose leaders Carlos Betancourt (under the pseudonym "Gerónimo"), Eduardo Candiales Barrios and Gabriel Puerta Aponte, Lieutenant Betancourt was confronted by the police organization from the beginning of the group. The DISIP conducted the first dismantling of this group between 1972 and 1973. They also acted against the Party of the Venezuelan Revolution (PRV-FALN) and other smaller groups, achieving frustrate many plans uprising of leftist groups of the time.

1970s
In the mid-1970s to the need to raise the technical level of the security agency was created Brigade speeches or Command groups led by the Commissioner General Henry Rafael López Sisco, who led major operations against leftist guerrillas in the field, these operations being considered DISIP as violations of human rights. In its early DISIP had nearly 4,000 employees on the payroll between the areas of administration, police and intelligence.

1980s
In this framework, the DISIP holding several clashes such as the Cantaura massacre, occurred between 4 and 8 October 1982 where some tens of DISIP agents with more than 400 soldiers from the Armed Forces killed 23 Front guerrilla fighters "Americo Silva", belonging to rural guerrilla group Red Flag.

1990s
In the 1990s, the DISIP forward intelligence operations against the rebel soldiers led by Hugo Chavez and Francisco Arias Cárdenas giving two attempted coup against President Carlos Andrés Pérez in 1992, the national government of the time authorized actions to not investigate suspects of participants in the coup. In the particular case of November 27, 1992, officers of the Brigade of Interventions, Vehicular Patrol, the General Intelligence and Investigation Division faced by National Guard military rebels, the latter being defeated. DISIP facilities in El Helicoide in Caracas were bombed by the rebel air force.

Vargas shootings

During the president Hugo Chávez, a crackdown against suspected looters in the state of Vargas following the 1999 mudslides became, according to Human Rights Watch, "the first major human rights test of the Chávez government. At first, Chávez dismissed the reports as 'suspicious' and 'superficial,' but the evidence soon obliged the president and other top government officials to acknowledge the seriousness of the situation." Human Rights Watch expressed their deep concern over DISIP (and National Guard) abuse in Venezuela in a 2004 personal letter to President Hugo Chávez. Amnesty International has also expressed concern over excessive use of force by the DISIP, and the increasing polarization and political violence in Venezuela since Chávez was elected in December 1998.

International
It is in the area of intelligence where it is thought that the body work to infiltrate the social, economic and political sectors. It is believed that conducted major operations in Central America and even Europe. One of the alleged lesser-known operations was made by the deceased Commissioner General Rafael Rivas-Vasquez who allegedly managed to locate and spy on Ilich Ramirez Sanchez, a Venezuelan militant of the Popular Front for the Liberation of Palestine, while living in France. In the eighties, DISIP possibly maintained close ties to other foreign intelligence services to exchange information on Arab revolutionary groups, especially the group of former members of the Red Army Faction or Baader Meinhof group.

Operations

"Simon Bolivar" satellite
The communications satellite "Simón Bolivar" released in 2008 was intended to achieve "absolute and secure handling of information" in the areas of telephony, data transmission and access to Internet which would have access to the DISIP. This would be followed by the purchase of a second satellite for "territorial observation and monitoring."

Monitoring the Amazon
It also participates in the monitoring system of the Amazon of Brazil "(Sivam) – providing information to the DISIP and other national security services to monitor the border to detect and neutralize incursions of guerrillas, drug traffickers, arms smugglers, paramilitary and illegal miners.

References

Venezuelan intelligence agencies
Secret police